Idan Tal (born 13 September 1975, in Beersheba) is a former Israeli professional footballer.

Tal was born in Beersheba, Israel, and is Jewish. He lives in Haifa, is married to Doreen, and has two children, Miron and Amit.

Club career
Tal started his career at Hapoel Jerusalem FC, moving to Maccabi Petah Tikva F.C. midway through the 1996–97 season. He joined his next club, Hapoel Tel Aviv FC, in the same period of 1998–99, winning the Israel State Cup with the side (its first title in 11 years).

In 1999–2000 Tal represented CP Mérida in Spain. Even though the Extremadura team finished in sixth position in the second division, it would be relegated due to irregularities, and he returned to Maccabi Petah Tikva, playing a handful of games before changing teams – and countries – again, as he signed with Everton in October 2000, appearing sparingly over the course of two 1/2 seasons.

In January 2003 Tal was released and returned to Spain, joining La Liga side Rayo Vallecano and suffering another relegation, this time on the pitch. In the summer, he signed for Maccabi Haifa FC.

On 9 November 2005, Tal received French citizenship, a process that took him five years to complete: his eligibility came through his wife Doreen, of French descent. The fact that he had acquired a European passport, along with his contract with Maccabi being due to expire at the end of the season, allowed him to renegotiate a return to Europe on a free transfer, where he would not count as a foreign player. In July 2006 he left the national champions to return to England, signing with Bolton Wanderers and sharing teams with compatriot Tal Ben Haim.

During his sole season, as Bolton qualified for the UEFA Cup as seventh, Tal appeared almost exclusively from the bench (12 out of his 16 Premier League appearances). He scored once, against Doncaster Rovers for the season's FA Cup. In July 2007, at nearly 32, he was sold to Beitar Jerusalem FC, signing a three-year contract worth £246,000.

Tal returned to Hapoel Jerusalem in July 2011, agreeing to a three-year deal with the second level outfit. On 26 October 2011 he revealed that, although he had signed a long-term contract, he would retire at the end of the season if he did not achieve promotion to the top flight, which eventually happened yet Tal continues to play for Hapoel to this date. In April of the following year he was given a US$2000 fine and a month-long suspension by the club, after an argument with Hapoel manager Michael Kadosh.

Coaching career
On 30 June 2013 he was appointed the manager of Hapoel Jerusalem. On December he left the job due to poor results.

Statistics

International career
Tal earned 69 caps for the Israeli national team during nine years, scoring five goals.

Honours

Team
Israeli League: 2003–04, 2004–05, 2005–06, 2007–08
Israeli Cup: 1998–99, 2007–08, 2008–09
Toto Cup: 2005–06, 2009–10

Individual
Israeli Player of the Year: 2004–05

See also
List of select Jewish association football (soccer) players

References

External links
 
 
 

1975 births
Living people
Israeli Jews
Israeli footballers
Hapoel Jerusalem F.C. players
Maccabi Petah Tikva F.C. players
Hapoel Tel Aviv F.C. players
CP Mérida footballers
Everton F.C. players
Rayo Vallecano players
Maccabi Haifa F.C. players
Bolton Wanderers F.C. players
Beitar Jerusalem F.C. players
La Liga players
Segunda División players
Premier League players
Israel international footballers
Israeli expatriate footballers
Expatriate footballers in Spain
Expatriate footballers in England
Israeli expatriate sportspeople in Spain
Israeli expatriate sportspeople in England
Israeli Premier League players
Footballers from Beersheba
People from Geva Binyamin
Israeli people of Iraqi-Jewish descent
Israeli people of Moroccan-Jewish descent
Association football midfielders
People with acquired French citizenship
Israeli settlers
Israeli Footballer of the Year recipients